David Williams was the Anglican Bishop of Huron and later  Metropolitan of Ontario in the 20th century.

Born in 1853 and educated at St David’s College, Lampeter, he was  ordained in 1885. His first post was a Curate at Blaenau Ffestiniog. In 1887 he became a professor at Huron Theological College. He was the rector of St James’ Stratford from 1892 to 1904 then Archdeacon of Perth. He was ordained to the episcopate as the Bishop of Huron in 1905 and became the Metropolitan of the Province of Ontario in 1926. He died in post on 7 October 1931.

Notes

 

 

1853 births
Alumni of the University of Wales, Lampeter
Anglican bishops of Ontario
Anglican bishops of Huron
Anglican archdeacons in North America
20th-century Anglican Church of Canada bishops
Metropolitans of Ontario
20th-century Anglican archbishops
1931 deaths
Archdeacons of Perth, ON